Eminent Domain is a period drama film released in 1990. It stars Donald Sutherland and Anne Archer and is directed by John Irvin.

Plot 
The film is based on the true story of a senior member of the Polish Politburo (played by Donald Sutherland) and his wife (played by Anne Archer) who are both abruptly banished from the party. While they struggle to figure out why, having unusual encounters with people they do not know in the process, things start to take a darker turn when the wife is sent to a mental asylum and their 15-year-old daughter is kidnapped.

Cast

Production
The movie was filmed on location in Gdańsk and Warsaw. According to film publicity, the movie was based on actual occurrences.

The movie grossed $151,098 in a limited U.S. theatrical release.

References

External links

 

1990 films
French drama films
Films set in 1979
Canadian drama films
English-language Canadian films
English-language French films
1990 drama films
Films about communism
Cold War films
Films directed by John Irvin
Films scored by Zbigniew Preisner
Films set in Poland
Films set in Warsaw
Films shot in Poland
Films shot in Warsaw
1990s English-language films
1990s Canadian films
1990s French films